Gilbert de Biham was an English medieval churchman, singer, and university chancellor.

Gilbert de Biham was a chantor and Canon of Wells Cathedral. Between 1246 and 1252, he was Chancellor of Oxford University.

References

Year of birth unknown
Year of death unknown
13th-century English Roman Catholic priests
English male singers
Chancellors of the University of Oxford